Doman may refer to:

Doman (surname)
Doman (river), Caraș-Severin County, Romania
Doman, a village in Reșița city, Caraș-Severin County, Romania
Doman Helicopters, an American helicopter manufacturing company
Doman (Khoikhoi) (died 1663), a Khoikhoi leader in the First Khoikhoi-Dutch War

See also
Doman Scandal, a Canadian political scandal
Daman (disambiguation)